Killeavy Saint Moninna's Gaelic Athletic Club is a Gaelic Athletic Association club based in Killeavy, County Armagh, near Newry, Northern Ireland. Killeavy won the 2012 Armagh Intermediate Football Championship and participates in other Armagh GAA football, ladies' football, hurling and camogie competitions. It is one of the largest clubs in the county, fielding upwards of 20 teams from Under-8 to Senior levels, and has been Ulster Club of the Year. The club's ground is Killeavy Memorial Park.

History

The club is one of the oldest in Armagh, having been founded in 1888. It marked its 125th anniversary in 2011 with a series of celebrations.

Gaelic football
It is one of a small number of clubs to have won the county Junior, Intermediate and Senior titles.

Killeavy defeated Crossmaglen in 1914 to win the Armagh Senior Football Championship by 3-02 to 1-01. It retained the title in 1915, beating Bessbrook Geraldines 0-04 top 0-02. The club won the Armagh Junior Football Championship in 1932. In the 1948 Senior final Killeavy was leading St Peter's of Lurgan by 2-04 to 3 points when the match had to be abandoned.

Killeavy won the Armagh Junior title again in 1980. In 1986 the club lifted the Armagh Intermediate Football Championship title, defeating Grange 1-15 to 1-11 in a reply. The club appeared again in the 2012 IFC final, defeating St Peter's by 0-15 to 2-08.

In 2009 Killeavy provided three players - James Donnelly, Kealan Downey and Conor King - for the Armagh team that won the All-Ireland Minor Football Championship.

Notable players

Stevie McDonnell, Armagh player 1999-2012, triple All Star
Paul Watters, Armagh player, 2005 NFL winning team

Honours
Armagh Minor Football Championship (5)

1954, 1987, 1996, 1997, 2012, 

 Ulster Minor Club Football Championship (1)
 1987; Runners-up 1996, Runners-up 2012.
 Armagh Senior Football Championship (3)†
 1914, 1915, 1948†; Runners-up 1924, 1951, 1955, 1988
 Armagh Intermediate Football Championship (2)
 1986, 2012, 2017; Runners-up 1966, 1983
 Armagh Junior Football Championship (2)
 1932, 1980

† 1948 SFC final abandoned with Killeavy in lead

Hurling
Eddie Fearon was the Armagh captain when they won the Allianz National Hurling League Division 3 Final on 30 April 2006, beating Longford in Kingspan Breffni Park, Co. Cavan - the first Armagh man to lift hurling silverware for the county in a long time.

Ladies' Gaelic football

Notable players
Aileen Matthews, member of Armagh's 2005 All-Ireland Junior Championship winning team

Camogie
There are under-8, under-10, under-12, under-14, under-16 and senior teams.

Facilities
GAA President Seán Kelly opened Killeavy's new pitch in 2005, when Armagh beat Meath in a challenge match. 

Activities organised by the social club include céilí dancing and whist.

References

External links
Killeavy GAC website
Killeavy GAC on Armagh GAA website

Gaelic games clubs in County Armagh
Gaelic football clubs in County Armagh